Tetrathemis irregularis cladophila known as the rainforest elf is a subspecies of Tetrathemis irregularis, a dragonfly in the family Libellulidae found only in Australia.

Description
It is a tiny to small, black and yellow dragonfly with a length of 25-30mm and wingspan of 40-50mm. The mostly clear wings are suffused with pale lemon. The abdomen is black with 3 to 4 yellow markings, and there is a metallic sheen on the synthorax.

Distribution
The genus Tetrathemis extends from Africa and Madagascar to south-east Asia, New Guinea and Australia. Tetrathemis irregularis cladophila has only been recorded coastal and adjacent inland from Cape York Peninsula to Cardwell in Queensland. The taxon has not yet been assessed for the IUCN Red List, but it appears in the Catalogue of Life.

Habitat
Tetrathemis irregularis cladophila inhabits streams in rainforest.

Gallery

References

Libellulidae
Odonata of Australia
Taxa named by Robert John Tillyard
Insects described in 1908